Explorations is an album by jazz pianist Bill Evans that was originally released on Riverside label in 1961. The album won the Billboard Jazz Critics Best Piano LP poll for 1961.

History
Explorations was the second album Evans recorded with his trio of Scott LaFaro on bass and Paul Motian on drums. Evans considered it one of his favorites from this period. Producer Orrin Keepnews in the liner notes talks about the two extra pieces that were released on the CD, "Beautiful Love (take 1)" and "The Boy Next Door"; the first version of "Beautiful Love" to be included in the original LP was a second take. In fact, as Keepnews specifies, "it is not the usual case of a second attempt that immediately followed the first. Early in this date, he played this number once; we both approved, and he moved on to something else. Much later, he decided to try a second 'Beautiful Love', which he later preferred." "The Boy Next Door," on the other hand, was set aside at the time of the LP, because of the limited space available on the album.

The album was remastered and reissued by Original Jazz Classics in 2011 with two previously unissued alternate takes.

Reception

The album won the Billboard Jazz Critics Best Piano LP poll for 1961.

David Rickert of All About Jazz wrote: "...Evans demands to be heard, seducing you with his indelibly emotional playing... The trio works magic here, breathing fresh air into standards such as 'How Deep Is the Ocean?' and 'Beautiful Love' and creating the illusion that these songs were written just so someone like Evans could play them. The highlight of the album is 'Elsa,' which is one of the most beautiful piano ballads on record." Writing for Allmusic, critic Thom Jurek said of the album: "Evans, with Paul Motian and Scott LaFaro, was onto something as a trio, exploring the undersides of melodic and rhythmic constructions that had never been considered by most... Explorations is an extraordinary example of the reach and breadth of this trio at its peak."

Track listing
"Israel" (John Carisi)  – 6:12
"Haunted Heart" (Arthur Schwartz, Howard Dietz)  – 3:28
"Beautiful Love" (take 1)  – 6:04
"Elsa" (Earl Zindars)  – 5:10
"Nardis" (Miles Davis)  – 5:49
"How Deep Is the Ocean?" (Irving Berlin)  – 3:31
"I Wish I Knew" (Harry Warren, Mack Gordon)  – 4:39
"Sweet and Lovely" (Gus Arnheim, Jules LeMare, Harry Tobias)  – 5:52

2011 CD reissue
"Israel"
"Haunted Heart"
"Beautiful Love" [Take 2]
"Elsa" 
"Nardis" 
"How Deep Is the Ocean?"
"I Wish I Knew" (Harry Warren)
"Sweet and Lovely" 
"The Boy Next Door"
"Beautiful Love" [Take 1]
"How Deep Is the Ocean?" [Take 2]
"I Wish I Knew" [Take 2]

Personnel 
 Bill Evans - piano
 Scott LaFaro - bass
 Paul Motian - drums

Additional personnel
 Orrin Keepnews - producer
 Bill Stoddard - engineer
 Jack Matthews - mastering engineer

References

Further reading

External links
Jazz Discography entries for Bill Evans
Bill Evans Memorial Library discography

1961 albums
Bill Evans albums
Riverside Records albums
Albums produced by Orrin Keepnews